The Baden ground skink (Scincella badenensis)  is a species of skink found in Vietnam.

References

Scincella
Reptiles described in 2019
Taxa named by Sang Ngoc Nguyen
Taxa named by Vu Dang Hoang Nguyen
Taxa named by Luan Thanh Nguyen
Taxa named by Robert W. Murphy